Harold W. Clements (22 July 1883 – 1939) was an English footballer who played in the Football League for West Bromwich Albion.

References

1883 births
1939 deaths
English footballers
Sportspeople from Worcester, England
Association football forwards
Scottish Football League players
English Football League players
West Bromwich Albion F.C. players
Worcester City F.C. players
Shrewsbury Town F.C. players
St Mirren F.C. players
Third Lanark A.C. players